The following is a list of players, both past and current, who appeared in at least one game for the Cleveland American League franchise known as the Blues (1901), Bronchos (1902), Naps (1903–14), Indians (1915–2021), and Guardians (2022–present).

Players in Bold are members of the National Baseball Hall of Fame. Players in Italics have had their numbers retired by the team.

List current as of the 2015 season


A

Fred Abbott
Paul Abbott
Al Aber
Bill Abernathie
Ted Abernathy
Harry Ables
Winston Abreu
Jeremy Accardo
Austin Adams
Bert Adams
Joe Adcock
Tommie Agee
Luis Aguayo
Jesús Aguilar
Hank Aguirre
Darrel Akerfelds
Matt Albers
Mike Aldrete
Bob Alexander
Gary Alexander
Hugh Alexander
Andy Allanson
Bob Allen
Chad Allen
Cody Allen
Greg Allen
Johnny Allen
Logan Allen
Neil Allen
Rod Allen
Milo Allison
Beau Allred
Roberto Alomar
Sandy Alomar Jr.
Dell Alston
Dave Altizer
Joe Altobelli
Luis Alvarado
Max Alvis
Rubén Amaro Jr.
Héctor Ambriz
Larry Andersen
Brady Anderson
Brian Anderson
Bud Anderson
Dwain Anderson
Jason Anderson
Ivy Andrews
Nate Andrews
Johnny Antonelli
Luis Aponte
Pete Appleton
Greg Aquino
Steve Arlin
Jack Armstrong
Mike Armstrong
Brad Arnsberg
Christian Arroyo
Jairo Asencio
Alan Ashby
Ken Aspromonte
Paul Assenmacher
Scott Atchison
Keith Atherton
Michael Aubrey
Rick Austin
Chick Autry
Bruce Aven
Earl Averill
Earl Averill Jr.
Bobby Ávila
Mike Avilés
John Axford
Benny Ayala
Dick Aylward
Joe Azcue

B

Mike Bacsik
Carlos Baerga
Danys Báez
Jim Bagby Jr.
Jim Bagby Sr.
Scott Bailes
Steve Bailey
Harold Baines
Bock Baker
Frank Baker
Howard Baker
Neal Ball
Mark Ballinger
Chris Bando
George Banks
Alan Bannister
Walter Barbare
Jap Barbeau
Josh Bard
Josh Barfield
Len Barker
Ray Barker
Jeff Barkley
Brian Barnes
Rich Barnes
Scott Barnes
Les Barnhart
Cliff Bartosh
Jim Baskette
Johnny Bassler
Ray Bates
Rick Bauer
Trevor Bauer
Jake Bauers
Jim Baxes
Harry Bay
Bill Bayne
Johnny Beall
Belve Bean
Gene Bearden
Kevin Bearse
Erve Beck
George Beck
Heinz Becker
Joe Becker
Gene Bedford
Phil Bedgood
Fred Beebe
Fred Beene
Rick Behenna
Beau Bell
Buddy Bell
David Bell
Eric Bell
Gary Bell
Jay Bell
Albert Belle
Ronnie Belliard
Harry Bemis
Ray Benge
Stan Benjamin
Henry Benn
Al Benton
Butch Benton
Johnny Berardino
Jason Bere
Moe Berg
Boze Berger
Heinie Berger
Al Bergman
Tony Bernazard
Bill Bernhard
Gerónimo Berroa
Joe Berry
Ken Berry
Bob Bescher
Rafael Betancourt
Kurt Bevacqua
Jason Beverlin
Jim Bibby
Shane Bieber
Mike Bielecki
Nick Bierbrodt
Josh Billings
Steve Biras
Joe Birmingham
Lloyd Bishop
Rivington Bisland
Bud Black
Don Black
George Blaeholder
Willie Blair
Casey Blake
Ossie Blanco
Fred Blanding
Larvell Blanks
Bert Blyleven
Bruce Bochte
Eddie Bockman
Joe Boehling
John Bohnet
Joe Boley
Jim Bolger
Cecil Bolton
Walt Bond
Bobby Bonds
Frank Bonner
Bill Bonness
Buddy Booker
Red Booles
Aaron Boone
Dan Boone
Ray Boone
Pat Borders
Joe Borowski
Dick Bosman
Harley Boss
Denis Boucher
Lou Boudreau
Michael Bourn
Abe Bowman
Ted Bowsfield
Gary Boyd
Jason Boyd
Jack Bracken
Buddy Bradford
Bill Bradley
Jack Bradley
Milton Bradley
Dick Braggins
Jeff Branson
Michael Brantley
Russell Branyan
Ad Brennan
Tom Brennan
Bert Brenner
Lynn Brenton
Bill Brenzel
Craig Breslow
Jamie Brewington
Charlie Brewster
Rocky Bridges
Dan Briggs
John Briggs
Lou Brissie
Johnny Broaca
Dick Brodowski
Jack Brohamer
Herman Bronkie
Tom Brookens
Ben Broussard
Frank Brower
Jim Brower
Andrew Brown
Clint Brown
Dick Brown
Jackie Brown
Jordan Brown
Jumbo Brown
Larry Brown
Lloyd Brown
Jerry Browne
Travis Buck
Garland Buckeye
Fritz Buelow
Dave Burba
Larry Burchart
Ellis Burks
Johnny Burnett
Jeromy Burnitz
George Burns
Ellis Burton
Jim Busby
Tom Buskey
Hank Butcher
John Butcher
Bill Butler
Brett Butler
Paul Byrd

C

Asdrúbal Cabrera
Fernando Cabrera
Jolbert Cabrera
Orlando Cabrera
Joe Caffie
Ben Caffyn
Wayne Cage
Cam Cairncross
Bruce Caldwell
Ray Caldwell
Dave Callahan
Paul Calvert
Ernie Camacho
Lou Camilli
Bruce Campbell
Soup Campbell
Cardell Camper
Casey Candaele
Tom Candiotti
Russ Canzler
Bernie Carbo
José Cardenal
Leo Cárdenas
Fred Carisch
Luke Carlin
Steve Carlton
Fausto Carmona
Eddie Carnett
Charlie Carr
Carlos Carrasco
Ezequiel Carrera
Jamey Carroll
Chico Carrasquel
Cam Carreon
Mark Carreon
Kit Carson
Matt Carson
Joe Carter
Paul Carter
Rico Carty
George Case
Sean Casey
Larry Casian
Carmen Castillo
Pete Center
Ed Cermak
Rick Cerone
Bob Chakales
Chris Chambliss
Bob Chance
Dean Chance
Ben Chapman
Ray Chapman
Sam Chapman
Larry Chappell
Joe Charboneau
Charlie Chech
Virgil Cheeves
Lonnie Chisenhall
Shin-Soo Choo
Mike Christopher
Russ Christopher
Vinnie Chulk
Chuck Churn
Al Cicotte
Al Cihocki
Adam Cimber
Bill Cissell
Aaron Civale
Uke Clanton
Allie Clark
Bob Clark
Bryan Clark
Dave Clark
Ginger Clark
Jim Clark
Mark Clark
Terry Clark
Watty Clark
Josh Clarke
Nig Clarke
Sumpter Clarke
Walter Clarkson
Mike Clevinger
Ty Cline
Billy Clingman
Lou Clinton
David Clyde
Chris Codiroli
Rocky Colavito
Vince Colbert
Alex Cole
Bert Cole
Bob Coleman
Gordy Coleman
Allan Collamore
Hap Collard
Don Collins
Jackie Collum
Bartolo Colón
Merl Combs
Steve Comer
Bunk Congalton
Sarge Connally
Bruce Connatser
Ed Connolly
Joe Connolly
Joe Connor
Jim Constable
Jack Conway
Herb Conyers
Dennis Cook
Alex Cora
Joey Cora
Wil Cordero
Marty Cordova
David Cortés
Marlan Coughtry
Fritz Coumbe
Stan Coveleski
Ted Cox
Howard Craghead
Rod Craig
Del Crandall
Keith Creel
Jack Cressend
Coco Crisp
Bill Cristall
Kyle Crockett
Ed Crosby
Frank Cross
Trevor Crowe
Francisco Cruceta
Jacob Cruz
Víctor Cruz
Roy Cullenbine
Nick Cullop (OF)
Nick Cullop (P)
Wil Culmer
George Culver
Aaron Cunningham
Tony Curry
Chad Curtis
Jack Curtis
Al Cypert

D

Jeff D'Amico
Paul Dade
Bill Dailey
Pete Dalena
Bud Daley
Tom Daly
Johnny Damon
Lee Dashner
Vic Davalillo
Homer Davidson
Bill Davis
Harry Davis
Jason Davis
Kane Davis
Steve Davis
Joey Dawley
Joe Dawson
Mike de la Hoz
Chubby Dean
Hank DeBerry
Jeff Dedmon
Frank Delahanty
David Dellucci
Rich DeLucia
Don Demeter
Steve Demeter
Ben Demott
Rick Dempsey
Kyle Denney
Otto Denning
John Denny
Sam Dente
Sean DePaula
Mark DeRosa
Gene Desautels
Paul Des Jardien
George DeTore
Jim Devlin
Bo Díaz
Einar Díaz
Juan Díaz
Paul Dicken
Chris Dickerson
George Dickerson
Don Dillard
Harley Dillinger
Miguel Diloné
Jerry Dipoto
Walt Doan
Joe Dobson
Pat Dobson
Larry Doby
Frank Doljack
Pat Donahue
Red Donahue
Jason Donald
Brendan Donnelly
Pete Donohue
Dick Donovan
Mike Donovan
Tom Donovan
Bill Doran
Red Dorman
Gus Dorner
Brian Dorsett
Cal Dorsett
Pete Dowling
Logan Drake
Tom Drake
Ryan Drese
Tim Drew
Jason Dubois
Frank Duffy
Dave Duncan
Shelley Duncan
George Dunlop
Steve Dunning
Shawon Dunston
Todd Dunwoody
Chad Durbin
Jerry Dybzinski
Jim Dyck

E

Truck Eagan
Luke Easter
Jamie Easterly
Ted Easterly
Dennis Eckersley
George Edmondson
Eddie Edmonson
Doc Edwards
Hank Edwards
Jim Joe Edwards
Harry Eells
Ben Egan
Bruce Egloff
Hack Eibel
Juan Eichelberger
Ike Eichrodt
Harry Eisenstat
Scott Elarton
Dave Elder
Frank Ellerbe
Bruce Ellingsen
John Ellis
George Ellison
Dick Ellsworth
Alan Embree
Red Embree
Joe Engel
Clyde Engle
Johnny Enzmann
Jim Eschen
Alex Escobar
José Escobar
Álvaro Espinoza
Chuck Essegian
Jim Essian
Ferd Eunick
Joe Evans
Adam Everett
Hoot Evers

F

Tony Faeth
Jerry Fahr
Ferris Fain
Bibb Falk
Cy Falkenberg
Harry Fanwell
Ed Farmer
Jack Farmer
Steve Farr
John Farrell
Sal Fasano
Bob Feller
Félix Fermín
Tony Fernández
Don Ferrarese
Wes Ferrell
Tom Ferrick
Cy Ferry
Chick Fewster
Cecil Fielder
Chuck Finley
Dan Firova
Carl Fischer
Mike Fischlin
Eddie Fisher
Gus Fisher
Ed Fitz Gerald
Paul Fitzke
Al Fitzmorris
Ray Flanigan
Les Fleming
Elmer Flick
Jesse Flores
Hank Foiles
Lew Fonseca
Ted Ford
Ray Fosse
Alan Foster
Ed Foster
Roy Foster
Ben Francisco
Julio Franco
Terry Francona
Tito Francona
George Frazier
Joe Frazier
Vern Freiburger
Dave Freisleben
Jim Fridley
Owen Friend
Buck Frierson
Doug Frobel
Johnson Fry
Travis Fryman
Kosuke Fukudome
Vern Fuller
Aaron Fultz
Frank Funk

G

Fabian Gaffke
Ralph Gagliano
Milt Galatzer
Denny Galehouse
Dave Gallagher
Jackie Gallagher
Shorty Gallagher
Oscar Gamble
Chick Gandil
Bob Garbark
Karim García
Mike Garcia
Larry Gardner
Ray Gardner
Rob Gardner
Ryan Garko
Wayne Garland
Clarence Garrett
Charlie Gassaway
Gary Geiger
Frank Genins
Jim Gentile
Greek George
Lefty George
George Gerken
Justin Germano
Jody Gerut
Al Gettel
Gus Getz
Jason Giambi
Gustavo Gil
Brian Giles
Johnny Gill
Chris Gimenez
Tinsley Ginn
Joe Ginsberg
Matt Ginter
Luke Glavenich
Jim Gleeson
Martin Glendon
Sal Gliatto
Bill Glynn
Ed Glynn
John Gochnauer
Bill Gogolewski
Jonah Goldman
Yan Gomes
Jeanmar Gómez
Rubén Gómez
Rene Gonzales
Andy González
Denny González
José González
Juan González
Orlando González
Pedro González
Raúl González
Lee Gooch
Wilbur Good
Dwight Gooden
Don Gordon
Joe Gordon
Mike Gosling
Al Gould
Mauro Gozzo
Rod Graber
Tony Graffanino
Peaches Graham
Tommy Gramly
Jack Graney
Eddie Grant
George Grant
Jimmy Grant
Mudcat Grant
Mickey Grasso
Danny Graves
Gary Gray
Johnny Gray
Ted Gray
Gene Green
Dave Gregg
Vean Gregg
Alfredo Griffin
Art Griggs
Bob Grim
Oscar Grimes
Jason Grimsley
Ross Grimsley II
Marquis Grissom
Steve Gromek
Bob Groom
Ernest Groth
Harvey Grubb
Johnny Grubb
Mark Grudzielanek
Cecilio Guante
Preston Guilmet
Lou Guisto
Tom Gulley
Red Gunkel
Jeremy Guthrie
Franklin Gutiérrez
Ricky Gutiérrez

H

Travis Hafner
Nick Hagadone
Rip Hagerman
Bob Hale
Odell Hale
Jimmie Hall
Mel Hall
Russ Hall
John Halla
Bill Hallman
Al Halt
Doc Hamann
Jack Hamilton
Steve Hamilton
Jack Hammond
Granny Hamner
Brad Hand
Rich Hand
Chris Haney
Jack Hannahan
Doug Hansen
Mel Harder
Carroll Hardy
Jack Hardy
Steve Hargan
Mike Hargrove
Spec Harkness
Tommy Harper
Toby Harrah
Billy Harrell
Ken Harrelson
Billy Harris
Bubba Harris
Joe Harris
Mickey Harris
Roric Harrison
Jack Harshman
Oscar Harstad
Bill Hart
Bruce Hartford
Grover Hartley
Bob Hartman
Luther Harvel
Zaza Harvey
Ron Hassey
Fred Hatfield
Arthur Hauger
Joe Hauser
Brad Havens
Wynn Hawkins
Howie Haworth
Brett Hayes
Frankie Hayes
Von Hayes
Jerad Head
Jeff Heath
Neal Heaton
Mike Hedlund
Bob Heffner
Jim Hegan
Jack Heidemann
Woodie Held
Hank Helf
Russ Heman
Charlie Hemphill
Rollie Hemsley
Bernie Henderson
George Hendrick
Harvey Hendrick
Tim Hendryx
Dave Hengel
Phil Hennigan
Earl Henry
Matt Herges
Remy Hermoso
Anderson Hernández
Jeremy Hernandez
José Hernández
Keith Hernandez
Roberto Hernández
Roberto Hernández
Alex Herrera
Frank Herrmann
Orel Hershiser
Otto Hess
Joe Heving
Jack Hickey
Charlie Hickman
Bob Higgins
Dennis Higgins
Mark Higgins
Oral Hildebrand
Tom Hilgendorf
Glenallen Hill
Herbert Hill
Hugh Hill
Ken Hill
Rich Hill
Shawn Hillegas
Bill Hinchman
Harry Hinchman
Chuck Hinton
Tommy Hinzo
Myril Hoag
Oris Hockett
Johnny Hodapp
Gomer Hodge
Bill Hoffer
Tex Hoffman
Kenny Hogan
Malachi Hogan
Eddie Hohnhorst
Dutch Holland
Todd Hollandsworth
Dave Hollins
Ken Holloway
Tyler Holt
Don Hood
Bob Hooper
Sam Horn
Tony Horton
Willie Horton
Dave Hoskins
TJ House
Tyler Houston
Art Houtteman
Doug Howard
Ivan Howard
Thomas Howard
Dixie Howell
Red Howell
Bob Howry
Dick Howser
Trenidad Hubbard
Willis Hudlin
David Huff
Mike Huff
Roy Hughes
Mark Huismann
Johnny Humphries
Bill Hunnefield
Bill Hunter
Billy Hunter

I

Joe Inglett
Happy Iott
Tommy Irwin

J

Damian Jackson
Jim Jackson
Mike Jackson (LHP)
Mike Jackson (RHP)
Randy Jackson
Shoeless Joe Jackson
Zach Jackson
Baby Doll Jacobson
Brook Jacoby
Jason Jacome
Big Bill James
Chris James
Dion James
Lefty James
Charlie Jamieson
Hi Jasper
Tex Jeanes
Mike Jeffcoat
Reggie Jefferson
Stan Jefferson
Dan Jessee
Johnny Jeter
Houston Jiménez
José Jiménez
Ubaldo Jiménez
Tommy John
Alex Johnson
Bob Johnson
Cliff Johnson
Elliot Johnson
Jason Johnson
Jerry Johnson
Larry Johnson
Lou Johnson
Vic Johnson
Doc Johnston
Doug Jones
Hal Jones
Sad Sam Jones
Toothpick Sam Jones
Willie Jones
Scott Jordan
Tom Jordan
Addie Joss
Jeff Juden
Walt Judnich
Josh Judy
Jorge Julio
Ken Jungels
David Justice

K

Ike Kahdot
Nick Kahl
George Kahler
Bob Kaiser
Jeff Kaiser
Scott Kamieniecki
Willie Kamm
Paul Kardow
Benn Karr
Steve Karsay
Marty Kavanagh
Scott Kazmir
Austin Kearns
Pat Keedy
Dave Keefe
Mike Kekich
Tom Kelley
Bob Kelly
Pat Kelly
Ken Keltner
Fred Kendall
Bill Kennedy
Bob Kennedy
Vern Kennedy
Jerry Kenney
Jeff Kent
Marty Keough
Jim Kern
Jack Kibble
Mike Kilkenny
Ed Killian
Jerry Kindall
Ralph Kiner
Eric King
Jim King
Dennis Kinney
Jason Kipnis
Wayne Kirby
Jay Kirke
Willie Kirkland
Harry Kirsch
Garland Kiser
Ron Kittle
Malachi Kittridge
Lou Klein
Hal Kleine
Ed Klepfer
Ed Klieman
Lou Klimchock
Steve Kline (LHP)
Steve Kline (RHP)
Johnny Klippstein
Corey Kluber
Joe Klugmann
Cotton Knaupp
Bill Knickerbocker
Ray Knode
Masahide Kobayashi
Elmer Koestner
Brad Komminsk
Larry Kopf
Mike Koplove
Casey Kotchman
George Kottaras
Kevin Kouzmanoff
Joe Krakauskas
Jack Kralick
Tom Kramer
Gene Krapp
Harry Krause
Rick Kreuger
Rick Krivda
Gary Kroll
John Kroner
Ernie Krueger
Art Kruger
Jason Kubel
Jack Kubiszyn
Harvey Kuenn
Bub Kuhn
Kenny Kuhn
Duane Kuiper
Hal Kurtz
Bob Kuzava
Steven Kwan

L

Bob Lacey
Candy LaChance
Guy Lacy
Aaron Laffey
Nap Lajoie
Tim Laker
Ray Lamb
Otis Lambeth
Tom Lampkin
Grover Land
Jim Landis
Sam Langford
Mark Langston
Matt Langwell
Matt LaPorta
Juan Lara
Greg LaRocca
Dave LaRoche
Lyn Lary
Fred Lasher
Bill Laskey
Barry Latman
Bill Lattimore
Bryan Lavastida
Ron Law
Jim Lawrence
Roxie Lawson
Matt Lawton
Bill Laxton
Emil Leber
Ricky Ledée
C. C. Lee
Cliff Lee (OF)
Cliff Lee (P)
David Lee
Leron Lee
Mike Lee
Thornton Lee
Gene Leek
Paul Lehner
Norm Lehr
Nemo Leibold
Dummy Leitner
Scott Leius
Jack Lelivelt
Johnnie LeMaster
Bob Lemon
Jim Lemon
Eddie Leon
Joe Leonard
Jesse Levis
Dutch Levsen
Dennis Lewallyn
Jensen Lewis
Mark Lewis
Scott Lewis
Glenn Liebhardt, Sr.
Jeff Liefer
Brent Lillibridge
Derek Lilliquist
Carl Lind
Lyman Linde
Francisco Lindor
Bill Lindsay
Jim Lindsey
Fred Link
Larry Lintz
Bob Lipski
Joe Lis
Pete Lister
Mark Little
Larry Littleton
Paddy Livingston
Bobby Locke
Stu Locklin
Kenny Lofton
Howard Lohr
Ron Lolich
Sherm Lollar
Al López
Albie López
José López
Luis López
Marcelino López
Bris Lord
Andrew Lorraine
Torey Lovullo
Grover Lowdermilk
Derek Lowe
John Lowenstein
Ryan Ludwick
Matt Luke
Héctor Luna
Gordy Lund
Jack Lundbom
Harry Lunte
Al Luplow
Jordan Luplow
Billy Lush
Rube Lutzke
Russ Lyon

M

Chuck Machemehl
Ray Mack
Felix Mackiewicz
Clarence Maddern
Ever Magallanes
Sal Maglie
Tom Magrann
Chris Magruder
Jim Mahoney
Duster Mails
Scott Maine
Hank Majeski
Candy Maldonado
Rick Manning
Jeff Manto
Shaun Marcum
Roger Maris
Fred Marsh
Lou Marson
Andy Marte
Billy Martin
Morrie Martin
Tom Martin
Carlos Martínez
Dennis Martínez
Joe Martinez
Michael Martinez
Sandy Martínez
Tony Martínez
Víctor Martínez
Willie Martínez
Justin Masterson
Tom Mastny
Carl Mathias
Dave Maurer
Lee Maye
Jimmy McAleer
Zach McAllister
Bake McBride
Ralph McCabe
Jack McCarthy
Barney McCosky
Tommy McCraw
Frank McCrea
John McDonald
Jim McDonnell
Jack McDowell
Oddibe McDowell
Sam McDowell
Deacon McGuire
Jim McGuire
Marty McHale
Stuffy McInnis
Hal McKain
Mark McLemore
Cal McLish
Don McMahon
Harry McNeal
Pat McNulty
George McQuillan
Luis Medina
Moxie Meixell
Sam Mele
Bill Melton
Oscar Mercado
Kent Mercker
Lou Merloni
Matt Merullo
José Mesa
Bud Messenger
Dewey Metivier
Catfish Metkovich
Dutch Meyer
Dan Miceli
Jason Michaels
John Middleton
Bob Milacki
Larry Milbourne
Johnny Miljus
Bob Miller
Ed Miller
Jake Miller
Matt Miller
Ray Miller
Randy Milligan
Buster Mills
Frank Mills
Jack Mills
Kevin Millwood
Al Milnar
Steve Mingori
Minnie Miñoso
Dale Mitchell
Kevin Mitchell
Willie Mitchell
Dave Mlicki
Danny Moeller
Mike Mohler
Blas Monaco
Sid Monge
Ed Montague
Leo Moon
Barry Moore
Earl Moore
Eddie Moore
Jim Moore
Andrés Mora
Billy Moran
Ed Morgan
Joe Morgan
Nyjer Morgan
Alvin Morman
Jeff Moronko
Jack Morris
Max Moroff
Guy Morton
Jerry Moses
Brandon Moss
Howie Moss
Don Mossi
Guillermo Mota
Edward Mujica
Terry Mulholland
Fran Mullins
Bob Muncrief
Tim Murchison
David Murphy
Eddie Murray
Heath Murray
Ray Murray
Jeff Mutis
Glenn Myatt
Brett Myers
Elmer Myers
Aaron Myette

N

Chris Nabholz
Lou Nagelsen
Russ Nagelson
Charles Nagy
Bill Nahorodny
Hal Naragon
Ray Narleski
Ken Nash
Jaime Navarro
Josh Naylor
Mike Naymick
Thomas Neal
Cal Neeman
Jim Neher
Bernie Neis
Dave Nelson
Rocky Nelson
Graig Nettles
Milo Netzel
Don Newcombe
Hal Newhouser
Alan Newman
Simon Nicholls
Rod Nichols
Chris Nichting
Dick Niehaus
Phil Niekro
Milt Nielsen
Bob Nieman
Harry Niles
Rabbit Nill
Al Nipper
Ron Nischwitz
Jayson Nix
Otis Nixon
Russ Nixon
Trot Nixon
Junior Noboa
Dickie Noles
Jim Norris
Les Nunamaker

O

Jack O'Brien
Pete O'Brien (1B)
Pete O'Brien (2B)
Paul O'Dea
John O'Donoghue
Hal O'Hagan
Steve O'Neill
Ted Odenwald
Blue Moon Odom
Bryan Oelkers
Chad Ogea
Tomo Ohka
Bob Ojeda
Steve Olin
Dave Oliver
Gregg Olson
Ivy Olson
Eddie Onslow
Jesse Orosco
Jorge Orta
Junior Ortiz
Harry Ostdiek
Harry Otis
Dave Otto
Johnny Oulliber
Bob Owchinko

P

Ernie Padgett
Karl Pagel
Pat Paige
Satchel Paige
Lowell Palmer
Frank Papish
Harry Parker
Chad Paronto
Lance Parrish
Casey Parsons
Ben Paschal
Camilo Pascual
Mike Paul
Carl Pavano
Stan Pawloski
Mike Paxton
Alex Pearson
Monte Pearson
Hal Peck
Roger Peckinpaugh
Gerónimo Peña
Orlando Peña
Tony Peña
Ken Penner
Jhonny Peralta
Jack Perconte
Chris Perez
Eddie Pérez
Eduardo Pérez
Rafael Pérez
Roberto Pérez
Tony Perezchica
Broderick Perkins
Jon Perlman
Bill Perrin
George Perring
Chan Perry
Gaylord Perry
Herb Perry
Jim Perry
Vinnie Pestano
John Peters
Rusty Peters
Cap Peterson
Fritz Peterson
Jesse Petty
Larry Pezold
Cord Phelps
Josh Phelps
Ken Phelps
Dave Philley
Adolfo Phillips
Brandon Phillips
Bubba Phillips
Eddie Phillips
Jason Phillips
Tom Phillips
Ollie Pickering
Marino Pieretti
Jim Piersall
Horacio Piña
Lou Piniella
Vada Pinson
Stan Pitula
Juan Pizarro
Eric Plunk
Ray Poat
Bud Podbielan
Johnny Podgajny
Lou Polchow
Jim Poole
Dave Pope
Dick Porter
Jay Porter
Wally Post
Lou Pote
Nellie Pott
Bill Pounds
Boog Powell
Ted Power
Vic Power
John Powers
Mike Powers
Bryan Price
Jackie Price
Ron Pruitt
Zach Putnam
Frankie Pytlak

Q

Jamie Quirk

R

Joe Rabbitt
Ryan Raburn
Dick Radatz
Scott Radinsky
Tom Raftery
Tom Ragland
Eric Raich
Larry Raines
Jason Rakers
Alex Ramírez
José Ramírez
Manny Ramírez
Domingo Ramos
Pedro Ramos
Clay Rapada
Morrie Rath
Mike Redmond
Jerry Reed
Steve Reed
Rudy Regalado
Herman Reich
Duke Reilley
Tom Reilly
Art Reinholz
Pete Reiser
Bugs Reisigl
Paul Reuschel
Anthony Reyes
Franmil Reyes
Allie Reynolds
Bob Reynolds
Mark Reynolds
Bob Rhoads
Arthur Rhodes
Kevin Rhomberg
Sam Rice
Denny Riddleberger
Steve Ridzik
Paul Rigdon
Jerrod Riggan
Juan Rincón
Ricardo Rincón
Billy Ripken
David Riske
Reggie Ritter
Jim Rittwage
Luis Rivas
Joe Roa
Jake Robbins
Bip Roberts
Dave Roberts
Jeriome Robertson
Eddie Robinson
Frank Robinson
Humberto Robinson
Mickey Rocco
John Rocker
Bill Rodgers
Nerio Rodríguez
Ricardo Rodríguez
Rich Rodriguez
Rick Rodriguez
Esmil Rogers
Dave Rohde
Dan Rohn
Billy Rohr
Rich Rollins
José Román
Johnny Romano
Niuman Romero
Ramón Romero
Vicente Romo
Phil Roof
Buddy Rosar
Dave Rosello
Al Rosen
Larry Rosenthal
Don Ross
Claude Rossman
Braggo Roth
Bob Rothel
Vinny Rottino
Mike Rouse
Luther Roy
Dick Rozek
Don Rudolph
Vern Ruhle
Rich Rundles
Jack Russell
Jeff Russell
Lloyd Russell
Hank Ruszkowski
Jim Rutherford
Buddy Ryan
Jack Ryan
Mark Rzepczynski

S

CC Sabathia
Carl Sadler
Mark Salas
Danny Salazar
Chico Salmon
Jack Salveson
Ken Sanders
Jerry Sands
Carlos Santana
Rafael Santana
José Santiago (1950s)
José Santiago (2000s)
Ángel Santos
Omir Santos
Scott Sauerbeck
Germany Schaefer
Joe Schaffernoth
Dan Schatzeder
Frank Scheibeck
Richie Scheinblum
Norm Schlueter
Ossee Schreckengost
Ken Schrom
Don Schulze
Bill Schwartz
Herb Score
Ed Scott
Scott Scudder
Rudy Seánez
Chris Seddon
Bob Seeds
Pat Seerey
David Seguí
Kevin Seitzer
Bill Selby
Justin Sellers
Ted Sepkowski
Joe Sewell
Luke Sewell
Richie Sexson
Gordon Seyfried
Wally Shaner
Joe Shaute
Bryan Shaw
Jeff Shaw
Danny Shay
Danny Sheaffer
Pete Shields
Jim Shilling
Ginger Shinault
Bill Shipke
Milt Shoffner
Kelly Shoppach
J. B. Shuck
Paul Shuey
Sonny Siebert
Brian Sikorski
Harry Simpson
Duke Sims
Tony Sipp
Carl Sitton
Grady Sizemore
Joe Skalski
Joel Skinner
Jack Slattery
Brian Slocum
Heathcliff Slocumb
John Smiley
Al Smith (OF)
Al Smith (P)
Bob Smith
Charlie Smith
Clay Smith
Elmer Smith
Joe Smith
Pop-Boy Smith
Roy Smith (1984-91)
Roy Smith (2001-02)
Sherry Smith
Syd Smith
Tommy Smith
Willie Smith
Cory Snyder
Earl Snyder
Russ Snyder
Bill Sodd
Moose Solters
Lary Sorensen
Zach Sorensen
Chick Sorrells
Paul Sorrento
Allen Sothoron
Billy Southworth
Jeremy Sowers
Tris Speaker
By Speece
Horace Speed
Justin Speier
Roy Spencer
Shane Spencer
Charlie Spikes
Dan Spillner
Jerry Spradlin
Jack Spring
Steve Springer
Joe Sprinz
Freddy Spurgeon
Eric Stamets
Jason Stanford
Lee Stange
Fred Stanley
Mike Stanton
Dolly Stark
George Starnagle
Bill Steen
Red Steiner
Bryan Stephens
Riggs Stephenson
Dave Stevens
Lee Stevens
Lefty Stewart
Sammy Stewart
Scott Stewart
Dick Stigman
Snuffy Stirnweiss
Tim Stoddard
George Stovall
Jesse Stovall
Oscar Streit
George Strickland
Jim Strickland
Jake Striker
Brent Strom
Floyd Stromme
Drew Stubbs
Ken Suarez
Charley Suche
Bill Sudakis
Billy Sullivan Jr.
Denny Sullivan
Jim Sullivan
Lefty Sullivan
Homer Summa
George Susce
Rick Sutcliffe
Darrell Sutherland
Drew Sutton
Russ Swan
Anthony Swarzak
Greg Swindell
Josh Swindell
Nick Swisher

T

Pat Tabler
Kazuhito Tadano
Mitch Talbot
Brian Tallet
Jeff Tam
Chuck Tanner
Willie Tasby
Eddie Taubensee
Julián Tavárez
Jackie Tavener
Dummy Taylor
Ron Taylor
Sammy Taylor
Birdie Tebbetts
Al Tedrow
Johnny Temple
Ralph Terry
Jake Thielman
Carl Thomas
Fay Thomas
Gorman Thomas
Pinch Thomas
Stan Thomas
Valmy Thomas
Art Thomason
Jim Thome
Rich Thompson
Ryan Thompson
Jack Thoney
Andre Thornton
Luis Tiant
Dick Tidrow
Bobby Tiefenauer
Tom Timmermann
Ron Tingley
Joe Tipton
Jess Todd
Chick Tolson
Dick Tomanek
Josh Tomlin
Wyatt Toregas
Red Torkelson
Rusty Torres
Happy Townsend
Billy Traber
Jeff Treadway
Mike Tresh
Manny Trillo
Hal Trosky
Quincy Trouppe
Eddie Tucker
Ollie Tucker
Thurman Tucker
Eddie Turchin
Chris Turner
Matt Turner
Terry Turner
Jason Tyner
Dave Tyriver

U

Ted Uhlaender
George Uhle
Jerry Ujdur
Willie Underhill
Del Unser
Jerry Upp
Cecil Upshaw
Willie Upshaw
Juan Uribe
Giovanny Urshela
Bob Usher
Dutch Ussat

V

Mike Vail
Luis Valbuena
Efrain Valdez
Sergio Valdez
Vito Valentinetti
Elmer Valo
Al Van Camp
Ed Vande Berg
Johnny Vander Meer
Dike Varney
Cal Vasbinder
Ramón Vázquez
Jorge Velandia
Otto Vélez
José Veras
Mickey Vernon
Zoilo Versalles
Tom Veryzer
José Vidal
Ron Villone
Rube Vinson
José Vizcaíno
Luis Vizcaíno
Omar Vizquel
Dave Von Ohlen
Joe Vosmik
George Vukovich

W

Tom Waddell
Leon Wagner
Paul Wagner
Rick Waits
Howard Wakefield
Ed Walker
Gee Walker
Jerry Walker
Mike Walker
Mysterious Walker
Roy Walker
Roxy Walters
Zach Walters
Bill Wambsganss
Aaron Ward
Colby Ward
Preston Ward
Turner Ward
Curt Wardle
Jimmy Wasdell
Ron Washington
Mark Watson
Frank Wayenberg
Roy Weatherly
Dave Weathers
Floyd Weaver
Skeeter Webb
Les Webber
Mitch Webster
Ray Webster
Ralph Weigel
Dick Weik
Bob Weiland
Elmer Weingartner
Ollie Welf
Charley Wensloff
Bill Wertz
Vic Wertz
Hi West
Jake Westbrook
Wally Westlake
Gus Weyhing
Dan Wheeler
Ed Wheeler
Pete Whisenant
Alex White
Rick White
Earl Whitehill
Mark Whiten
Fred Whitfield
Ed Whitson
Kevin Wickander
Bob Wickman
Bill Wight
Sandy Wihtol
Milt Wilcox
Hoyt Wilhelm
Denney Wilie
Eric Wilkins
Roy Wilkinson
Ted Wilks
Jerry Willard
Brian Williams
Dick Williams
Eddie Williams
Matt Williams
Fred Williams
Reggie Williams
Rip Williams
Stan Williams
Walt Williams
Les Willis
Frank Wills
Art Wilson
Enrique Wilson
Frank Wilson
Jim Wilson
Nigel Wilson
Red Wilson
Fred Winchell
Ralph Winegarner
Dave Winfield
George Winn
Rick Wise
Bobby Witt
Mark Wohlers
Ed Wojna
Ernie Wolf
Roger Wolff
Blake Wood
Bob Wood
Kerry Wood
Smoky Joe Wood
Roy Wood
Steve Woodard
Hal Woodeshick
Gene Woodling
Chuck Workman
Tim Worrell
Craig Worthington
Ab Wright
Gene Wright
Jamey Wright
Jaret Wright
Lucky Wright
Joe Wyatt
Whit Wyatt
Early Wynn

Y

George Yeager
Rich Yett
Earl Yingling
Mike York
Elmer Yoter
Bobby Young
Cliff Young
Cy Young
Ernie Young
George Young
Matt Young
Mike Young
Carl Yowell

Z

Bradley Zimmer
Jimmy Zinn
Sam Zoldak
Bill Zuber
Paul Zuvella
George Zuverink

See also
List of Cleveland Indians managers
List of Cleveland Indians owners and general managers
List of Cleveland Indians seasons

External links
BR batting statistics
BR pitching statistics

Major League Baseball all-time rosters
Roster